Kap's Amazing Stories is a Philippine television informative show broadcast by GMA Network. Hosted by Bong Revilla, it premiered on August 19, 2007. The show concluded on July 6, 2014.

Overview

The show uses at least five clips, ranked from five up to one, like Most Amazing and Astonishing Moments does, and this format continues to Totally Wild and Most Daring, even if those two shows did not originally rank their videos. Clips are usually from National Geographic's  Most Amazing and Astonishing Moments, Totally Wild, Wild Case Files,  truTV's Most Daring, Animal Planet's The Most Extreme, BBC's Life, Planet Earth, Life in the Undergrowth, The Blue Planet, Frozen Planet,  Africa and lately, Stan Lee's Superhumans.

It also had a children's spin-off titled Kap's Amazing Stories Kids Edition that premiered on January 31, 2010, as Revilla was campaigning for a senator in the 2010 Philippine Senate election. Its presenters were Ramboy Revilla, Jayda Avanzado and Angeli Nicole Sanoy. The show featured an Animal Kingdom and World's Deadliest Animals. Guest presenters in Kap's Amazing Stories Kids Edition include Ogie Alcasid, Carmina Villaroel and Elmo Magalona. The show ended in July 2010, after Revilla's re-election as Senator of the Philippines.

Hosts
 Bong Revilla Jr. 
 Jillian Ward as Marikít

Ratings
According to AGB Nielsen Philippines' Mega Manila household television ratings, the final episode of Kap's Amazing Stories scored a 12.9% rating.

Accolades

References

External links
 

2007 Philippine television series debuts
2014 Philippine television series endings
Filipino-language television shows
GMA Network original programming
Philippine television shows